The West Indies national cricket team visited India in 1987-88 for a 4-match Test series and followed by 7 one day international matches along with a one-off benevolent fund match. The test series was drawn 1-1 and West Indies won the ODI series with 6-1.

Test Series

1st Test

2nd Test

3rd Test

4th Test

ODIs

The West Indies won the Charminar Challenge Cup 6-1.

1st ODI

2nd ODI

3rd ODI

4th ODI

Indian Board Benevolent Fund Match

Scheduling issues and disagreement between the two Boards led to this match not counting as part of the Charminar Challenge Cup. The West Indians refused to allow the match to be counted as part of the Cup. The proceeds of the match went to the Cricketers’ Benevolent Fund.

5th ODI

6th ODI

7th ODI

References

International cricket competitions from 1985–86 to 1988
1987 in Indian cricket
1987 in West Indian cricket
West Indian cricket tours of India
Indian cricket seasons from 1970–71 to 1999–2000